Auchumpkee Creek is a stream in the U.S. state of Georgia. It is a tributary to the Flint River.

"Auchumpkee" is a name derived from the Muskogean language meaning "hickory nuts all over". A variant name is "Oak Chunk Creek".

References

Rivers of Georgia (U.S. state)
Rivers of Crawford County, Georgia
Rivers of Monroe County, Georgia
Rivers of Upson County, Georgia